Chandi Kori is a 2015 Indian Tulu film directed by Devadas Kapikad also appearing in a supporting role. Arjun Kapikad and Karishma Amin star in lead roles, and Naveen D. Padil, Bhojaraj Vamanjoor, Gopinath Bhat and Aravind Bolar feature in supporting roles.
The film successfully completes 100 days in Mangalore and Udupi. The film was produced by Sharmila Kapikad and Sachin Sunder.

Cast
 Arjun Kapikad
 Karishma Amin
 Devadas Kapikad
 Naveen D. Padil
 Bhojaraj Vamanjoor
 Aravind Bolar
 Gopinath Bhat 
 Chethan Rai 
 D. S. Boloor
 Sarojini Shetty
 Shobha Rai
 Sumithra Rai
 Manisha
 Sujatha
 Thimmappa Kulal
 Suresh Kulal

Soundtrack

The soundtrack of the film was composed by Devadas Kapikad and the film's score was composed by Manikanth Kadri. The soundtrack album was released on 20 August 2015 with the Anand Audio acquiring the audio rights.

List of Tulu Movies Links
List of tulu films of 2015
List of Tulu films of 2014
List of Released Tulu films
Tulu cinema
 Tulu Movie Actors
 Tulu Movie Actresses
Karnataka State Film Award for Best Regional film
RED FM Tulu Film Awards
Tulu Cinemotsava 2015

References

2015 films
Tulu-language films